Takeshi Itoh (伊東毅 or 伊東 たけし, Itoh Takeshi; born March 15, 1954) is a Japanese jazz fusion saxophonist and flute player. He is currently a part of the jazz fusion band T-Square.

Biography

Early life and career 
Itoh had been interested in music since he was a child, leaning how to play piano and violin. At Momochi Junior High School, he joined a brass band with a euphonium and tuba. He entered Seinan Gakuin High School and chose to become a flute player, but after reading Sadao Watanabe 's autobiography, Boku Jishin no Tame no Jazz, he turned to alto saxophone.

He entered the Nihon University College of Art and belonged to the Rhythm Society Orchestra. At the same time, he joined the bands Witch Hunt and Last Day. The drummer of Witch Hunt, Michael Seiichi Kawai, was also the drummer for a band called The Square, led by guitarist Masahiro Andoh, and Itoh made guest appearances due to this connection. After the disbandment of Witch Hunt, he joined The Square in 1977.

Debut and T-Square 
In 1984, he released his debut album, Dear Hearts. In 1985, he released his second album L7.

In 1990, he left T-Square to pursue a solo career, but returned to the band in late 2000. Around the time of his return, T-Square had split into two separate groups: Trio The Square (with bassist Mitsuru Sutoh, drummer Hiroyuki Noritake and keyboardist Keiji Matsumoto) and T-Square (with Itoh, guitarist Masahiro Andoh and session musicians).

In 2014, he released the album Favorites, his first album in seven years.

Discography

Studio albums

References 

Japanese flautists
Japanese saxophonists
Living people
1954 births
20th-century Japanese musicians
20th-century flautists